The surnames Guliev, Guliyev, etc. are slavicised from the variants of the Turkic Quli. Its female version is Guliyeva. The surname Kuliev is of the same origin, and both can be transliterated from the native languages as Quliyev.

The surname may refer to:
Adil Guliyev (19221992), Azerbaijani Soviet Air Force officer
Ayaz Guliyev (born 1996), Azerbaijani Russian footballer
Ayyub Guliyev (born 1954), Azerbaijani astrophysicist
 (19561991), Soviet alpine skier
Elchin Musaoglu (Guliyev) (born 1966), Azerbaijani filmmaker
Emin Guliyev, several people
Emin Quliyev (born 1977), Azerbaijani footballer
Emin Guliyev (swimmer) (born 1975), Azerbaijani swimmer
Eshgin Guliyev (born 1990), Azerbaijani footballer
Farid Guliyev (born 1986), Azerbaijani footballer
Firidun Guliyev (born 1994), Azerbaijani weightlifter
Fuad Guliyev (born 1941), Azerbaijani politician
Ilhama Guliyeva (born 1943), Azerbaijani celebrity
Irada Guliyeva (born 1973), Azerbaijani footballer
Kamal Guliyev (born 1976), Azerbaijani footballer
Namig Guliyev (born 1974), Azerbaijani chess player
Ramil Guliyev (born 1990), Turkish Azerbaijani runner
Rasul Guliyev (born 1947), Azerbaijani politician
Roza Guliyeva (born 1998), Azerbaijani footballer 
Tarlan Guliyev (born 1992), Azerbaijani footballer 
Tofig Guliyev (19172000), Azerbaijani composer
Vagif Guliyev (born 1957), Azerbaijani mathematician
Vilayat Guliyev (born 1952), Azerbaijani diplomat
Zafar Guliyev (born 1972), Azerbaijani wrestler
Zahra Guliyeva (born 1951), Azerbaijani violinist, concertmaster and professor

Azerbaijani-language surnames
Patronymic surnames